Dong Yanmei (born 16 February 1977 in Dalian, Liaoning Province) is a Chinese long-distance runner who specialized in the 5000 metres. She has not competed on the top level since 2002.

Achievements

Personal bests
1500 metres - 3:55.07 min (1997)
3000 metres - 8:33.07 min (2000)
5000 metres - 14:29.82 min (1997)
10,000 metres - 30:38.09 min (1997)

External links
 

1977 births
Living people
Chinese female long-distance runners
Runners from Liaoning
World Athletics record holders (relay)
Universiade medalists in athletics (track and field)
Goodwill Games medalists in athletics
Universiade gold medalists for China
Athletes from Dalian
Medalists at the 2001 Summer Universiade
Competitors at the 1998 Goodwill Games